Redmond Bunn 'R.B.' Gautier Jr. was an American lawyer and politician. He was born in Miami, Florida to City of Miami judge and later mayor, R.B. Gautier and Ida F Miller Gautier.

He served in the Florida House of Representatives from 1943 to 1945, and he was a 1956 delegate to the 1956 Democratic National Convention
Gautier was a trustee for the University of Miami.

References

External links 

Miami Stories: Rooted to pioneering days on Miami Herald
 Gautier Family and First United Methodist Church of Miami on Miami History
 HistoryMiami official website of HistoryMiami (formerly the Historical Museum of Southern Florida)
 People of Lawmaking

Members of the Florida House of Representatives
Politicians from Miami
Florida lawyers